The relationship between Islam and music has long been a complex and controversial matter. Many Muslims believe that the Quran and Sunnah prohibit music (instruments and singing); however other Muslims disagree and believe that some forms of music are permitted. Despite this controversy, music has been popular and flourished at various times and places in the Islamic world, often in palaces and private homes to avoid censorship.

In many parts of the Muslim world devotional/religious music and secular music is well developed and popular. However, music is allowed also as singing is allowed, or some instruments such as drums are allowed, or allowed if it does not lead listeners into temptation. This can change considering their own decision. In recent decades, "the advent of a whole new generation of Muslim musicians who try to blend their work and faith", has given the issue "extra significance."

Historically, Islamic art and music flourished during the Islamic Golden Age.

Overview

Music and interpretations of Islamic law

The question of whether music is permitted or forbidden in Islam is a matter of debate among scholars. The Qur'an does not specifically refer to music itself. Some scholars, however, have interpreted the phrase "idle talk", which is discouraged, as including music.

Music appears in several hadith in an unfavorable way, with one example being: "Singing sprouts hypocrisy in the heart as rain sprouts plants." But there is disagreement over the reliability of these narrations. Another hadith reads: "There will be among my Ummah people who will regard as permissible adultery, silk, alcohol and musical instruments." But again, the reliability of this hadith has also been questioned, most notably by Ibn Hazm al-Dhahiri.

One scholar, Jacob M. Landau, discerns "four main groups" in the dispute over whether music is haram:
 Uncompromising purists opposed to any musical expression; 
 Religious authorities admitting only the cantillation of the Qur'an and the call to prayer, or adhan;
 Scholars and musicians favoring music, believing there to be no musical difference between secular and religious music; and 
 Important mystical fraternities, for whom music and dance were a means toward unity with God.

Among the groups that believe the Quran and Islam tradition "strictly" prohibit music are the Salafi, Wahhabi, and Deobandi denominations.

In his survey of Islamic scholarship of "enjoined what was good and forbade what was bad" in accordance to Islamic law, historian Michael Cook found that 
"Attacks on offending objects are a ubiquitous theme ... There are, for example, chess-boards to be overturned, supposedly sacred trees to be cut down and decorative images to destroy or deface ... But the targets that are mentioned again and again are liquor and musical instruments. (An exception was sometimes made for tambourines which were used to announce marriages)."

Prohibitions of music are rare or non-existent in majority-Muslim states since the coming to power of Muhammad bin Salman in Saudi Arabia, but have often been enforced where Islamist insurgents have gained power – in Afghanistan under Taliban rule; and at least as of January 2013, "across much of the two-thirds of Mali ... controlled by Islamic rebel groups".

Varieties of opinion
There is a fairly wide difference of opinion over what exceptions can be made to the prohibition on music. Examples of what is allowed include: vocals but not instruments; vocals but only if the audience is of the same gender; vocals and drums, or vocals and traditional one sided drum and tambourine, but no other instruments; any kind of music provided it is not passionate, sexually suggestive, or has lyrics in violation of Islam.
Some Muslims believe musical instruments are haram and only vocals are allowed, but the performer must be of the same gender as the audience.
Non-instrumental music (whatever the audience) has led to a rich tradition of a cappella devotional singing in Islam. In support of singing being halal, the jurist Abu Bakr ibn al-Arabi says, "No sound hadith is available concerning the prohibition of singing", while Ibn Hazm says, "All that is reported on this subject is false and fabricated."
There are some Muslims who believe drums are permissible, but no other instruments.
Zakir Naik, maintains musical instruments are haram except for two—the daf (a traditional one sided drum) and tambourine, which are also mentioned in Hadith.
An exception in the prohibition of music can be made for women playing the Daf, at celebrations and festivals, according to a minority group of Sunni Islam and another a group of Shiites. This exception comes from a well-known hadith in which two small girls were singing to a woman, and the Islamic Prophet Muhammad instructed Abu Bakr to let them continue, stating, "Leave them Abu Bakr, for every nation has an Eid (i.e. festival) and this day is our Eid".
Still other Muslims believe that all instruments are allowed, provided they are used for acceptable or halal types of music and are not sexually arousing or un-Islamic. Hence there is a long history of instrumental accompaniments to devotional songs, particularly in the Shia and Sufi traditions. Many Sufi orders use music as part of their worship.
According to the Irish Times, "a majority of Muslims" follow the view taken by modern scholars such as Yusuf al-Qaradawi that music is forbidden "only if it leads the believer into activities that are clearly defined as prohibited, such as drinking alcohol and illicit sex".

Imam al-Ghazali, reported several hadith and came to the conclusion that music in and of itself is permitted, saying: "All these Ahadith are reported by al-Bukhari and singing and playing are not haram." He also references a narration from Khidr, wherein a favorable opinion of music is expressed.

According to Hussein Rashid, "contemporary scholars including Shaykh al-Azhar Mahmud Shaltut, Shaykh Yusuf Qaradawi, and Ayatollah Ruhollah Khomeini have all issued legal rulings that audio arts [including music] that do not encourage people to go against the faith are permitted."
Notable people who are regarded as having believed music is halal include Abu Bakr ibn al-Arabi, Ibn al-Qaisarani, Ibn Sina, Abu Hamid al-Ghazali, Abd al-Ghani al-Nabulsi, Rumi, Ibn Rushd, and Ibn Hazm.
 
Yusuf al-Qaradawi in his book "The Lawful and the Prohibited in Islam", states songs/singing is not haram unless:
the subject matter of songs is "against the teachings of Islam", such as praising wine;
the "manner" of singing is haram, such as "being accompanied by suggestive sexual movement";
it leads to "excessive involvement with entertainment", such as wasting time that ought to be spent on religion;
if it "arouses one's passions, leads him towards sin, excites the animal instincts, and dulls spirituality";
if it is done "in conjunction with haram activities – for example, at a drinking party".

Shia interpretation and Iran 

Based upon the ahadith, numerous Iranian Grand Ayatollahs; Sadiq Hussaini Shirazi, Mohammad-Reza Golpaygani, Lotfollah Safi Golpaygani, Mohammad-Taqi Mesbah-Yazdi, Ahmad Jannati and others, ruled that all music and instrument playing is haram, no matter the purpose. Grand Ayatollah Ruhollah Khomeini held similar religious position, stating on 23 July 1979: "If you want independence for your country, you must suppress music and not fear to be called old‐fashioned. Music is a betrayal of the nation and of youth." During the Iranian Revolution, Khomeini said: "...music is like a drug, whoever acquires the habit can no longer devote himself to important activities. We must completely eliminate it." From 1979 to 1989, all the music on radio and television was banned except occasional "revolutionary songs" that were performed in a strong martial style. After Khomeini's death, reformist Rafsanjani and Khatami administrations gradually lifted the ban on music. The current supreme leader of Iran, Ali Khamenei, in 2014 has stated his admiration of Western music, and nowadays music is officially permitted in Iran by the government as long as it is Iranian -- Iranian folk music, classical music, and pop music is allowed.

Doubts about prohibition
At least a few sources blame prohibition of music not on rigorous interpretation of scripture but the association of "fashionable" secular music "with erotic dance and drinking" (Jacob M. Landau), or "illicit behavior tied to music, rather than to the music itself" (Hussein Rashid). According to Rashid, the Quran, "contains no direct references to music", and hadith contains "conflicting evidence"; Landau states that scholars antagonistic to music "relied on forced interpretations of a few unclear passages in the Qurʾān" or Hadīth".

Islamic music

Notwithstanding prohibitions on music by Islamic scholars, in many parts of the Muslim world devotional/religious music and secular music is well developed and popular. Historically, Islamic art and music flourished during the Islamic Golden Age.

Secular and folk musical styles in the Muslim Middle East are found in Arabic music, Egyptian music, Iranian music, Turkish classical music. In North Africa, Algerian, and Moroccan music. South Asia has distinctive Afghan, Bangladeshi, Maldivian, Pakistani music

Nasheed is a Muslim devotional recitation music recited in various melodies by some Muslims of today without any musical instruments, or possibly with percussion.

Music for public religious celebrations includes: 
Ta'zieh music (Shia. a passion play depicting the martyrdom of Imam Hussein, part musical drama, part religious drama, rarely performed outside Iran); 
Ashurah music (Shia., performed during the Muharram mourning period, commemorating the deaths of Imam Hussein and his followers); 
Thikiri (from the Arabic word "Dhikr") which means remembrance of God—performed by the Qadiriyya Sufi orders of waYao or Yao people in East and Southern Africa (Tanzania, Mozambique, Malawi, Zimbabwe, and South Africa); 
Manzuma (moral songs performed in Ethiopia); Madih nabawi (Arabic hymns praising Muhammad).

At least according to one scholar, Jacob M. Landau, not only is secular and folk music found in regions throughout the Muslim world, but Islam has its own distinctive category of music -- "Islamic music" or "classical Islamic music"—that began development "with the advent of Islam about 610 CE" as a "new art". It formed from pre-Islamic Arabian music with "important contributions" from Persians, Byzantines, Turks, Imazighen (Berbers), and Moors. This music "is characterized by a highly subtle organization of melody and rhythm", where "the vocal component predominates over the instrumental", there is no harmony, only "a single line of melody", and the individual musician "is permitted, and indeed encouraged, to improvise". The core area where it is found stretches "from the Nile valley to Persia", and the farther away one travels, "the less one finds undiluted Islamic music."

See also
 Islamic music
 Music censorship

References

External links 
 Islamic Arts, Music Britannica.com